Madritsch is an Austrian surname  of South Slavic origin. Notable people with the surname include:
Bobby Madritsch (born 1976), American baseball pitcher
Julius Madritsch (1906–1984), Austrian Righteous Among the Nations

German-language surnames
Surnames of Austrian origin
Germanized Slavic family names